Edmé Codjo was a Beninese manager of the Benin national football team from August 2011 to January 2012.

Career 
He had previously been in charge of the national team during the 2008 Africa Cup of Nations qualification campaign.

References 

Year of birth missing (living people)
Living people
Beninese football managers
Benin national football team managers